Julius Plücker (16 June 1801 – 22 May 1868) was a German mathematician and physicist. He made fundamental contributions to the field of analytical geometry and was a pioneer in the investigations of cathode rays that led eventually to the discovery of the electron. He also vastly extended the study of Lamé curves.

Biography

Early years 
Plücker was born at Elberfeld (now part of Wuppertal). After being educated at Düsseldorf and at the universities of Bonn, Heidelberg and Berlin he went to Paris in 1823, where  he came under the influence of the great school of French geometers, whose founder, Gaspard Monge, had only recently died.

In 1825 he returned to Bonn, and in 1828 was made professor of mathematics.

In the same year he published the first volume of his Analytisch-geometrische Entwicklungen, which introduced the method of "abridged notation".

In 1831 he published the second volume, in which he clearly established on a firm and independent basis projective duality.

Career 
In 1836, Plücker was made professor of physics at University of Bonn. In 1858, after a year of working with vacuum tubes of his Bonn colleague Heinrich Geißler, he published his first classical researches on the action of the magnet on the electric discharge in rarefied gases. He found that the discharge caused a fluorescent glow to form on the glass walls of the vacuum tube, and that the glow could be made to shift by applying an electromagnet to the tube, thus creating a magnetic field. It was later shown that the glow was produced by cathode rays.

Plücker, first by himself and afterwards in conjunction with Johann Hittorf, made many important discoveries in the spectroscopy of gases. He was the first to use the vacuum tube with the capillary part now called a Geissler tube, by means of which the luminous intensity of feeble electric discharges was raised sufficiently to allow of spectroscopic investigation. He anticipated Robert Wilhelm Bunsen and Gustav Kirchhoff in announcing that the lines of the spectrum were characteristic of the chemical substance which emitted them, and in indicating the value of this discovery in chemical analysis. According to Hittorf, he was the first who saw the three lines of the hydrogen spectrum, which a few months after his death, were recognized in the spectrum of the solar protuberances.

In 1865, Plücker returned to the field of geometry and invented what was known as line geometry in the nineteenth century. The construction uses 2×2 minor determinants, or equivalently the second exterior power of the underlying vector space of dimension 4. It is now part of the theory of Grassmannians 
(-dimensional subspaces of an -dimensional vector space ), to which the generalization of these co-ordinates to  minors of the  matrix of homogeneous coordinates, also known as Plücker coordinates, apply. The embedding of the Grassmannian  
into the projectivization  of the th exterior power of 
is known as the Plücker embedding.

Bibliography
 1828: Analytisch-Geometrische Entwicklungen from Internet Archive
 1835: System der analytischen Geometrie, auf neue Betrachtungsweisen gegründet, und insbesondere eine ausführliche Theorie der Kurven dritter Ordnung enthaltend
 1839: Theorie der algebraischen Curven, gegründet auf eine neue Behandlungsweise der analytischen Geometrie
 1846: System der Geometrie des Raumes in neuer analytischer Behandlungsweise, insbesondere die Theorie der Flächen zweiter Ordnung und Classe enthaltend
 1852: System der Geometrie des Raumes in neuer analytischer Behandlungsweise, insbesondere die Theorie der Flächen zweiter Ordnung und Classe enthaltend. Zweite wohlfeilere Auflage
 1865: On a New Geometry of Space Philosophical Transactions of the Royal Society 14: 53–8
 1868: Neue Geometrie des Raumes gegründet auf die Betrachtung der geraden Linie als Raumelement. Erste Abtheilung. Leipzig.
 1869: Neue Geometrie des Raumes gegründet auf die Betrachtung der geraden Linie als Raumelement. Zweite Abtheilung. Ed. F. Klein. Leipzig.
 1895–1896: Gesammelte Wissenschaftliche Abhandlungen, Band 1 (vol. 1), Mathematische Abhandlungen (edited by Arthur Moritz Schoenflies &  Friedrich Pockels), Teubner 1895, Archive, Band 2 (vol. 2), Physikalische Abhandlungen (edited by Friedrich Pockels), 1896, Archive

Awards
Plücker was the recipient of the Copley Medal from the Royal Society in 1866.

See also 
Birkeland–Eyde process
Duality (projective geometry)
Grassmannian
Ion pump
Parameter space
Timeline of low-temperature technology

References

Bibliography
 Born, Heinrich, Die Stadt Elberfeld. Festschrift zur Dreihundert-Feier 1910. J.H. Born, Elberfeld 1910
 Giermann, Heiko, Stammfolge der Familie Plücker, in: Deutsches Geschlechterbuch, 217. Bd, A. Starke Verlag, Limburg a.d.L. 2004
 Strutz, Edmund, Die Ahnentafeln der Elberfelder Bürgermeister und Stadtrichter 1708–1808. 2. Auflage, Verlag Degener & Co., Neustadt an der Aisch 1963

External links 

 
 The Cathode Ray Tube site
 
 
 
 Julius Plücker in der philosophischen Fakultät der Universität Halle (PDF)
 Julius Plücker und die Stammfolge der Familie Plücker, Deutsches Geschlechterbuch, 217. Bd., A. Starke Verlag, Limburg a.d.L. 2004 (Word)
 uni-bonn.de „Ein streitbarer Gelehrter im 19. Jahrhundert. Der Mathematiker Julius Plücker starb vor 140 Jahren.“ Pressemitteilung der Universität Bonn vom 21. Mai 2008
"Discussion of the general form for light waves" (English translation)

1801 births
1868 deaths
19th-century German mathematicians
19th-century German physicists
Recipients of the Copley Medal
People from Elberfeld
People from the Rhine Province
Academic staff of the University of Bonn
Foreign Members of the Royal Society
Scientists from Wuppertal